is a Japanese actor who has appeared in a number of feature films and television series. He is represented by the talent agency Orega.

Filmography

TV series

Films

References

External links
 Orega official website 

Japanese male actors
1978 births
Living people
Actors from Aichi Prefecture